HNoMS Myg was a small torpedo boat for use in fjords and harbours. Myg was built at the Royal Norwegian Navy's shipyard in Horten, with the yard number 82. Apparently the design was not considered successful, and no further vessels in the class was laid down.

External links
 Photo of Myg 

 

1899 ships
Ships built in Horten
Torpedo boats of the Royal Norwegian Navy